The women's marathon at the 2018 European Athletics Championships took place in the inner districts of Berlin on 12 August.

Records

Schedule

Results
46 athletes finished the race.

References

Marathon W
Marathons at the European Athletics Championships
Euro
European
Marathons in Germany
Women's marathons